Imperial Esports, or simply Imperial, is a Brazilian professional esports organization. It is best known for its Counter-Strike: Global Offensive team, which is made up of veteran players from the Brazilian scene, such as FalleN, fer, fnx, boltz and VINI. While the team has changed over time, the 2022 team, nicknamed "The Last Dance" (in reference to The Last Dance series) gained popularity in the run-up to the Rio 2022 Major. The organization also has a Crossfire team.

Counter-Strike: Global Offensive

History 
On September 5, 2018, Imperial acquired the Counter-Strike team from Santos e-Sports. In early 2022, after the contract of all its players expired, the organization signed "The Last Dance", a team created by Gabriel "FalleN" Toledo that aimed to bring together veterans of the Brazilian competitive scene. Rumors indicated that the initial idea was to bring together the five former members of the team that won two Majors, one for Luminosity Gaming and another for SK Gaming, composed of FalleN, Fernando "fer" Alvarenga, Lincoln "fnx" Lau, Marcelo "coldzera" David and Epitacio "TACO" de Melo, however, the last two players already had other projects and chose not to participate. Brazilians Ricardo "boltz" Prass and Vinicius "VINI" Figueiredo were chosen to complete the team, in addition to Luis "peacemaker" Tadeu as coach.

The team managed, through the American RMR, to qualify to compete in the PGL Major Antwerp 2022 at the Challengers Stage and then move on to the Legends Stage, where they were eliminated without reaching the playoffs.

On August 12, Imperial announced peacemaker's departure from the team due to "some internal issues within the group". On August 21, it was announced that fnx would stop playing for the team and would assume the role of coach; he was replaced by Marcelo "chelo" Cespedes.

On October 9, Imperial secured the remaining 24-team berth of the IEM Rio Major 2022 in a 2–1 closely fought series against North American Complexity Gaming, with the final map being 22–20.  Unfortunately, the team did not get good results in the tournament and fell in the first phase.

Current roster

References 

2018 establishments in Brazil
Esports teams based in Brazil
Esports teams established in 2018
Counter-Strike teams